The Wiltshire Horn is a breed of domestic sheep originally from Wiltshire in southern England raised for meat. The breed is unusual among native British breeds, for it has the unusual feature of moulting its short wool and hair coat naturally in spring, obviating the need for shearing. They are good mothers and have high fertility.

History
The Wiltshire Horn was until the eighteenth century one of the predominant sheep breeds of southern England.  For hundreds of years, it served a clear function on the thin chalk soils of the Wiltshire Downs, requiring little shelter from the elements and providing dung and urine to fertilise the wheat-growing land. At the same time, it provided an easily managed source of quality meat, but the rising price of wool and a general move away from horned sheep had the breed suffer a dramatic decline throughout the 19th and 20th centuries.

It was nearly extinct at the start of the 1900s. In 1923, in an attempt to save the breed, the Wiltshire Horn Breed Society was formed. In the early 1980s, 45 registered flocks were in the UK, but the 2009 edition of the flock book of the Wiltshire Horn Sheep Society recognises almost 300 flocks.

The Wiltshire Horn is one of the foundation breeds for Katahdin, Wiltipoll, and Easycare breeds and the Hampshire breed along with Southdown sheep and the Berkshire Nott.

Until the 20th century, the breed was chiefly traded at local events such as the Westbury Hill Fair.

Characteristics
Males and females both have horns. Ram horns grow one full spiral each year until maturity. Both sexes are white with occasion black spots on the undercoat. This is a hair breed, growing a thick, coarse coat in the winter and shedding in the summer.

Farming
No longer a rare breed, the Wiltshire Horn is proving its worth to three particular groups of producers:

 The smaller-scale producer seeking added value with quality, naturally reared, full-flavoured meat.
 The large commercial operator can tap into Wiltshire Horn genetics and create wool-shedding hybrids, so freeing themselves from the expense and hassle of annual shearing;
 The smallholder and hobbyist values the breed for its meat, its easy-to-handle conformation, and its low-input, no-shear attributes.

References

External links
UK Wiltshire Horn Sheep Society
Australian Wiltshire Horn Breeders Association
Belgian breeder with extra information about this breed (only available in dutch)

Sheep breeds
Sheep breeds originating in England